Jeffrey Stepakoff is an American television writer, producer, and author.

Education
After graduating from Woodward Academy in College Park, Georgia in 1981, Stepakoff earned a degree in journalism from the University of North Carolina at Chapel Hill. After graduation, he began working at an advertising agency. He graduated from Carnegie Mellon University with a Master of Fine Arts in playwriting in 1988.
He teaches at Kennesaw State University as Associate Professor of Screenwriting since 2006.

Career
Stepakoff's ticket to television writing came through a Carnegie Mellon contact who was involved with ER. The contact helped introduce him to an agent and David Milch, creator of "Deadwood" and NYPD Blue. The 1988 Writers Guild of America strike prevented Stepakoff from working right away. Although he was offered a job as a scab writer for CBS's Charles in Charge, produced by Universal Television, he turned it down. When the strike ended, he was offered another job by Universal to write for Simon & Simon. In 2015 Jeffrey Stepakoff was appointed the Executive Director of the Georgia Film Academy.

Credits
His credits include Zoe Busiek: Wild Card (hired by Lynn Marie Latham), Major Dad, Dawson's Creek, Tarzan, Hyperion Bay, "C-16: FBI", "Flipper", "Sisters (Creative Consultant), "The Wonder Years", "Major Dad", and "Simon & Simon".

Stepakoff also created pilots for 20th Century Fox, Paramount Pictures, MTM, Fox and ABC. He developed and wrote major motion pictures, including Disney's Tarzan and Brother Bear.

Awards/Nominations/Publications

Books
His book BILLION-DOLLAR KISS: The Kiss That Saved Dawson’s Creek and Other Adventures in TV Writing, a revealing account of his experiences in the television industry, is a critically acclaimed one.

Fiction
Fireworks Over Toccoa, St. Martin's Press, 2010
The Orchard, St. Martin's Press, 2011
The Melody of Secrets, St. Martin's Press, 2013

Membership
Stepakoff is a member of the Writers Guild of America, the Writers Guild of Canada, the Screen Actors Guild, and IATSE, and is a voting member of the Academy of Television Arts and Sciences. He currently resides with his wife and children in Dunwoody, Georgia.

References

External links
 

Living people
Place of birth missing (living people)
Year of birth missing (living people)
Screenwriting instructors
American television producers
American television writers
American male television writers
UNC Hussman School of Journalism and Media alumni
Woodward Academy alumni